Lancashire United may refer to:

Blackburn Bus Company - bus operator that traded as Lancashire United until 2016
Lancashire United Transport - former bus operator that ceased in 1976